In Wendish mythology Misizla (or Sicksa) was a godlike hero. He was a warrior-musician wearing sword and armour, playing his bagpipe. He may in fact be Misizlaw (died 999) who wanted to restore Slavic pagan faith.

References
Ingeman, B. S. Grundtræk til En Nord-Slavisk og Vendisk Gudelære. Copenhagen 1824.

Slavic mythology